Spectral is a 2016 military science fiction action film directed by Nic Mathieu. Written by himself, Ian Fried, and George Nolfi from a story by Fried and Mathieu. The film stars James Badge Dale, Max Martini, Emily Mortimer, Clayne Crawford and Bruce Greenwood. The film was released worldwide on December 9, 2016 on Netflix. On February 1, 2017, Netflix released a prequel graphic novel of the film called Spectral: Ghosts of War which was made available digitally through the website ComiXology.

Plot 

DARPA researcher Dr. Mark Clyne flies from Virginia to Moldova, the current deployment location of the US military in the ongoing Moldovan War, to be consulted on one of his creations, a line of hyperspectral imaging goggles that have been issued to troops there. After arriving at a US military airbase on the outskirts of Chișinău, he meets with US Army General Orland and CIA officer Fran Madison. They show him footage captured by the troops' goggles of a mysterious, translucent, humanoid apparition that kills almost instantaneously. Knowing it is not interference, Orland wants Clyne's expert opinion before forwarding the findings and footage to his superiors. Conversely, Madison believes the sightings to be members of the local insurgency wearing an advanced form of active camouflage and has orders from her superiors to retrieve a sample.

To get a clearer shot of the anomalies and identify them, both Clyne and Madison accompany a team of Delta Force operators into the field to find Utah team that went missing the day before. To capture a better image of the apparitions, Clyne mounts a larger, more powerful version of the hyperspectral camera on top of one of the armored personnel carriers. Upon arriving at the location, they discover all of the members of the Utah team (except one member named Comstock, who is found alive hiding under a bath tub) are dead along with the insurgents. They are ambushed by the apparitions, who, being impervious to small arms fire and explosives, inflict heavy casualties before the soldiers retreat. After landmines render their vehicles inoperable and kill Comstock, the group takes cover in an abandoned factory where they find two children barricaded inside. The apparitions attempt to follow them but are stopped by a barrier of iron shavings.  The children share that their father scattered the shavings to protect his children before he was killed. The survivors make contact with the airbase and set up a rendezvous. Clyne modifies the hyperspectral camera into a large searchlight, which enables the group to see the apparitions without the need for goggles. Clyne points out numerous crates of iron shavings lying around the factory, which the unit uses to turn their grenades into IEDs laced with iron shavings to give them a fighting chance. Fortified with these new weapons, the group sets out for the rendezvous point about a half-mile away from the factory. About an hour before the extraction time, the apparitions find a way to cross the barrier, forcing the survivors to leave the factory.

The apparitions chase the group, who uses the iron explosives to slow them down. Reinforcements and a helicopter evac join them at the rendezvous point, a largely abandoned plaza. However, they are ambushed by the apparitions and are barely able to escape as the figures kill one of the children and the soldiers sent as backup. Once safely in the air, they receive word from Orland that the apparitions have overrun the airbase, so they are redirected to a civilian bunker controlled by the allied Moldovan military. Thinking over what he learned from the young girl they have rescued, Clyne deduces the apparitions are likely man-made and are made of Bose-Einstein condensate, which explains their ability to move through walls, freeze people to death, and the inability to pass through iron shavings and ceramic materials (hence their inability to penetrate ceramic tank armor and Comstock's hiding place under the bath tub). Working overnight with Orland and surviving military engineers, he constructs several makeshift pulse weapons capable of breaking down the condensate. The next morning, the remaining American soldiers head to the Masarov power plant in the center of the city by V-22 Ospreys, as Clyne believes it is the only facility capable of generating the power needed to create the condensate.

While the soldiers mount an offensive distraction on the roof of the plant, Clyne and Madison descend down to a recently overrun laboratory inside. They deduce that scientists, working in weapons research for the former regime, were scanning humans on a molecular level and using advanced 3D printing to replicate them in condensate form. The human test subjects' brains and peripheral nervous systems were then removed and hooked up to a central machine that keeps the condensate copies (or "apparitions") alive. With the battle above threatening to release the remaining condensates, Clyne finally finishes activation of the failsafe system, which deactivates the condensate apparitions. Believing that whatever level of consciousness remaining is in pain, he unplugs the human remains from the machine, finally giving them peace.

With the apparitions gone, the US and allied Moldovan military continue their work of taking control of the city from the insurgents. A Department of Defense extraction team is to be sent back to the plant with the Delta Force operators to take the machinery apart and potentially use it for their own purposes. Saying goodbye to Madison and General Orland, Clyne boards a V-22 Osprey to be taken back home to Virginia.

Cast 
 James Badge Dale as Clyne, a DARPA scientist
 Emily Mortimer as Fran Madison, a CIA officer who runs Delta Force operations in Moldova's war torn capital
 Max Martini as CPT Major Sessions, the leader of the Delta Force team
 Bruce Greenwood as General Orland, the leader of US Army troops deployed to fight in the Moldovan War
 Clayne Crawford as SGT Toll
 Gonzalo Menendez as Cabrera
 Ursula Parker as Sari, a young Moldovan girl
 Louis Ozawa Changchien as SGT Chen
 Cory Hardrict as Alessio
 Aaron Serban as Bogdan, Sari's little brother
 Dylan Smith as Talbot
 Jimmy Akingbola as McFadden
 Ryan Robbins as Comstock
 Stephen Root as Dr. Mindala
 Philip Bulcock as SGT Davis
 Royce Pierreson as Diaz
 Declan Hannigan as Hayden
 Mark O'Neal as Lewis
 Michael Bodie as Efrem

Production 
During the summer of 2014, Legendary Pictures and Universal Pictures announced that commercials director Nic Mathieu would make his feature debut directing Fried's screenplay for the supernatural action film Spectral which would star James Badge Dale, Max Martini, Bruce Greenwood and Emily Mortimer. Described as a supernatural Black Hawk Down, Spectral centers on a special-ops team dispatched to fight supernatural beings who have taken over a European city.

Ian Fried wrote the original script, which was re-written by Mathieu, Jamie Moss, John Gatins and George Nolfi, who received sole screenwriting credit, with Mathieu and Fried receiving story credit.

Principal photography 
Principal photography began on August 7, 2014. Shooting started on August 28, 2014 in various streets and buildings in Budapest, Hungary, relying extensively on practical effects and locations for an authentic, gritty atmosphere. Locations included Buda Castle, which served as the location of the landing zone scene, and Gellért Hill. Filming was completed in August 2015. Peter Jackson’s Weta Workshop produced the futuristic weapons and Weta Digital created the visual effects for the film.  Universal Pictures anticipated a release in August 2016 but decided against this and transferred the rights to Netflix which released it on December 9, 2016.

Release 
Initially, Universal Pictures was going to distribute the film, setting an August 12, 2016 release date for the film. In June 2016, the film was pulled from the schedule. Netflix later acquired distribution rights to the film and released the film worldwide on December 9, 2016.

On February 1, 2017, Netflix released a prequel comic of the movie called Spectral: Ghosts of War made available digitally through the website ComiXology.

Critical reception
Rotten Tomatoes gives the film an approval rating of 78% based on 9 reviews, with an average rating of 5.70/10.

Writing for The Verge, Tasha Robinson summarises "It’s understandable that Netflix jumped at the chance to grab what was intended as a big-screen, large-scale thriller. But Spectral winds up feeling like a much smaller film, like something that was intended for a casual streaming experience all along."

References

Further reading 
 The science of Spectral: Is that really how Bose–Einstein condensate behaves?  An actual Bose–Einstein condensate scientist reviews Spectral's science. Plus a response from the film's director, Nic Mathieu. Thilo Stöferle. July 18, 2017. Ars Technica.  Accessed June 4, 2021.

External links 
 
 Spectral on Netflix
 
 
 
 
 

2016 films
2016 action thriller films
2016 directorial debut films
2016 science fiction action films
2010s war films
American 3D films
American action thriller films
American science fiction action films
English-language Netflix original films
Films produced by Thomas Tull
Films scored by Junkie XL
Films set in Moldova
Films shot in Budapest
Films with screenplays by George Nolfi
Legendary Pictures films
Military science fiction films
Techno-thriller films
2010s American films